Moero or Myro was a woman poet of the Hellenistic period from the city of Byzantium. She was the wife of Andromachus Philologus and the mother – the Suda says daughter, but this is less likely – of the tragedian Homerus of Byzantium.  Moero was probably active during the late fourth and early third centuries BC.

Little of Moero's poetry has survived.  Ten lines from her epic poem Mnemosyne are quoted by Athenaeus, and Meleager includes two four-line epigrams in his Garland.  Additionally, she is known to have written a poem called Arai ("Curses").  This is known only through a scholion on Parthenius of Nicaea's Erotica Pathemata, which notes that the myth of Alcinoe is told in it.  Finally, Eustathios mentions that she wrote a hymn to Poseidon.

The surviving fragment of Moero's Mnemonsyne tells the story of Zeus' childhood on Crete, where he had been hidden by his mother Rhea to save him from being killed by his father Cronus.  Like the surviving fragment of Corinna's poem on the contest between Cithaeron and Helicon (PMG 654 col. i), it retells an episode of Zeus' early life to emphasise the role of women.  One of her surviving epigrams is addressed to a bunch of grapes; the other asks some dryads to protect a man who has carved a statuette for them.

Moero seems to have had a high reputation as a poet in antiquity.  Antipater of Thessalonica includes her in his list of famous women poets, and Meleager's proem to his Garland refers to her as a "lily", putting her alongside Sappho and Anyte.  According to Tatian, Cephisodotus, the son of Praxiteles, sculpted her. Two epigrams which refer to Moero, composed by Anyte and Marcus Argentarius, survive in the Greek Anthology, and may be a reworking of a now-lost poem by Moero.

References

Works cited
 
 
 
 

3rd-century BC women writers
3rd-century BC writers
3rd-century BC Greek people
3rd-century BC poets
Ancient Byzantines
Epigrammatists of the Greek Anthology
Ancient Greek epic poets
Ancient Greek elegiac poets
Ancient Greek lyric poets
Ancient Greek women poets
Women satirists
3rd-century BC Greek women